The 211th Coastal Division was an infantry division of the Royal Italian Army during World War II. Royal Italian Army coastal divisions were second line divisions formed with reservists and equipped with second rate materiel. They were often commanded by officers called out of retirement.

History 
The division was activated on 15 November 1941 in Cittanova by reorganizing the XI Coastal Sector Command. The division was assigned to XXXI Army Corps, which was responsible for the defense of southern Calabria. The division was responsible for the coastal defence of southernmost part of the coast of Calabria: on the Tyrrhenian Sea side from Capo Vaticano to the outskirts of Scilla, on the Ionian Sea side from Capo dell'Armi to Badolato.

Between 3 and 8 September the division skirmished with troops of British XIII Corps, which had landed in southern Calabria in Operation Baytown. After the Armistice of Cassibile was announced the division remained at its positions and surrendered to the British XIII Corps. Afterwards the division joined the Italian Co-belligerent Army, but did not participate in the Italian campaign. The division was dissolved in summer 1944.

Organization 
 211th Coastal Division, in Cittanova
 53rd Coastal Regiment
 CCXII Coastal Battalion
 XI Dismounted Squadrons Group/ Regiment "Lancieri di Vittorio Emanuele II"
 118th Coastal Regiment
 CCCXLVIII Coastal Battalion
 CCCLVIII Coastal Battalion
 IX Dismounted Squadrons Group/ Regiment "Lancieri di Aosta"
 143rd Coastal Regiment
 CCCXXV Coastal Battalion
 XV Dismounted Squadrons Group/ Regiment "Cavalleggeri di Palermo"
 49th Coastal Artillery Regiment
 LVIII Coastal Artillery Group
 LXXXIV Coastal Artillery Group
 534th Mortar Company (81mm Mod. 35 mortars)
 211th Mixed Engineer Company
 327th Anti-paratroopers Unit
 448th Anti-paratroopers Unit
 211th Carabinieri Section
 180th Field Post Office
 Division Services

Attached to the division:
 185th Paratroopers Regiment "Nembo"/ 184th Paratroopers Division "Nembo"
 Command Company
 III Paratroopers Battalion
 VIII Paratroopers Battalion
 XI Paratroopers Battalion
 Anti-tank Company (47/32 anti-tank guns)
 DCCCXV Coastal Battalion
 DCCCXVI Coastal Battalion
 DCCCXL Coastal Battalion
 LVIII Guardia alla Frontiera Artillery Group
 CCIV Artillery Group
 Armored Train 120/1/S, in Siderno (4x 120/45 Mod. 1918 naval guns, 4x 20/77 anti-aircraft guns)

Commanding officers 
The division's commanding officers were:

 Generale di Brigata Francesco La Ferla (15 November 1941 - 17 September 1942)
 Generale di Brigata Felice Gonnella (18 September 1942 - ?)

References 

 
 

Coastal divisions of Italy
Infantry divisions of Italy in World War II